The Lamborghini Aventador is a mid-engine sportscar produced by the Italian automotive manufacturer Lamborghini. In keeping with Lamborghini tradition, the Aventador is named after a Spanish fighting bull that fought in Zaragoza, Aragón, in 1993. The Aventador is the successor for the Murciélago and was made by hand in Sant'Agata Bolognese, Italy.

History

Launched on 28 February 2011 at the Geneva Motor Show, five months after its initial unveiling in Sant'Agata Bolognese, the vehicle, internally codenamed LB834, was designed to replace the then-decade-old Murciélago as the new flagship model.

Soon after the Aventador's unveiling, Lamborghini announced that it had sold 12 cars, with deliveries starting in the second half of 2011. By March 2016, Lamborghini had built 5,000 Aventadors.

Specifications and performance

Specifications

Engine 
The Aventador LP 700–4 used Lamborghini's   60° V12 engine weighing 235 kg. Known internally as the L539, the new engine is Lamborghini's fifth in-house engine and second V12 design. It is the first all-new V12 since the 3.5 litre powerplant found in the 350GT.

Performance 
 : 2.9 seconds
 : 6.4 seconds
 : 10.5 seconds at 
 Top speed: 
 
 
 
The transmission, a seven-speed single-clutch automated manual, is built by Graziano Trasmissioni. Despite being single-clutch, gear-shifts are accomplished in 50 milliseconds.
 
The new, electronically controlled, all-wheel drive system is developed and supplied by the Swedish company Haldex Traction, offering traction and handling capabilities based on their 4th generation technology.
 
The Lamborghini Aventador LP 700-4 was replaced by the facelifted Aventador S in 2016.

Models

Aventador LP 700-4 (2011–2016)

The Aventador LP 700-4 was the first iteration of the Aventador and was designed by Filippo Perini. Production of the Aventador was planned to be limited to 4,000 vehicles; however, in 2016, it achieved the 5,000 unit milestone. The moulds used to make the carbon-fibre monocoque are expected to last 500 moulds each and only 8 have been made.

The car's shape borrows heavily from Lamborghini's limited-edition Reventón and the Estoque concept car.

The Aventador was unveiled at Lummus Park, Miami, followed by Miami International Airport, followed by Auto China 2014 (with Nazionale configuration via Lamborghini Ad Personam personalization program).

Aventador LP 700-4 Roadster (2013–2016)

The Aventador LP 700-4 Roadster was announced for production on 27 December 2012.

The removable roof consists of two carbon fibre panels, weighing  each, which required the reinforcement of the rear pillar to compensate for the loss of structural integrity as well as to accommodate the rollover protection and ventilation systems for the engine. The panels are easily removable and are stored in the front luggage compartment. The Aventador Roadster has a unique engine cover design and an attachable wind deflector to improve cabin airflow at super high speeds as well as a gloss black finish on the A-pillars, windshield header, roof panels, and rear window area. With a total weight of  it is only  heavier than the coupé (the weight of the roof, plus additional stiffening in the sills and A-pillars).

Aventador SuperVeloce LP 750-4 (2015–2017)

The Lamborghini Aventador SuperVeloce LP 750-4 was announced at the 2015 Geneva Motor Show. The car also features improved aerodynamics, with downforce increased by 180% as compared to the standard Aventador coupé. Notable aerodynamic upgrades are a revised front splitter and a rear diffuser along with a fixed CFRP rear wing. The car's driving dynamics have also been upgraded, featuring new enhanced electronic steering for superior maneuverability at high speeds, magnetic pushrod suspension for superior handling, and chassis improvements to increase rigidity. Delivery of the car began in the second quarter of 2015 with production limited to 600 units.

Production of the Aventador SuperVeloce LP 750-4 ended in July 2017 with the last car finished in a bespoke liquid silver metallic paint job.

Aventador SuperVeloce LP 750-4 Roadster (2016–2017)

The Lamborghini Aventador SuperVeloce LP 750-4 Roadster was unveiled at the 2015 Pebble Beach Concours d'Elegance. It featured a compact two-piece carbon fibre hardtop that can be stored in the trunk like the standard roadster. Deliveries began in the first quarter of 2016 and production was limited to 500 units.

Aventador S LP 740-4 (2016–2021)

The Lamborghini Aventador S was revealed on 19 December 2016 at the Sant'Agata factory. Official reveal of the car took place at the March 2017 Geneva Motor Show. The Aventador S is an update to the Aventador LP 700-4 with mechanical and exterior changes. The updated exterior of the car was designed by Lamborghini's head of design Mitja Borkert.

The Aventador S received four wheel steering, permanent four-wheel-drive and a slightly updated suspension. The suspension is controlled by the 'Lamborghini Dinamica Veicolo Attiva' (LDVA) control unit. The LDVA has four selectable modes – Sport, Strada (Street), Corsa (Track) and Ego (i.e. individual). Carbon ceramic brakes are standard (front: 400 mm, rear: 380 mm).
The nose was redesigned with a bigger front splitter and two new air ducts in the front bumper. At the rear, it has a new black rear diffuser with fins and three single exit exhaust tips. It has 130 per cent more front downforce than the original Aventador.

Aventador S LP 740-4 Roadster (2017–2021)

The roadster variant of the new Aventador S followed up in 2017 at the Frankfurt International Motor Show. The roadster is mechanically identical to the coupé with the only difference being the engine cover (identical to the standard Aventador roadster), two carbon fibre removable roof panels (weighing less than  stowable in the front compartment of the car and new optional wheels.

Aventador SVJ LP 770-4 (2018–2021)

Unveiled at the 2018 Pebble Beach Concours d'Elegance, the Aventador SVJ (Super Veloce Jota) is a track focused iteration of the Aventador S and an improvement over the Aventador SV.

A camouflaged prototype of the variant had previously made a new production car lap around the Nürburgring Nordschleife in July 2018, beating the previous record-holder, the Porsche 911 GT2 RS by setting a lap time of 6:44.97 with Lamborghini test driver Marco Mapelli behind the wheel achieved by using the Pirelli Pzero Trofeo R tyres available with the car as an option.

The Aventador SVJ is the first production V12 Lamborghini model to feature Lamborghini's Aerodinamica Lamborghini Attiva (ALA) system. This allows the car to achieve 40% more downforce than the Aventador SV and 1% reduction in the coefficient of drag. The system adds aerodynamic components to the car including a disconnected front splitter, tri-dimensional air outlet on the bonnet, a large carbon fibre rear wing with a central fin, underbody aero design with vortex generators, and a large rear diffuser. The system works in conjunction with Lamborghini Dinamica Veicolo Attiva 2.0 (LDVA 2.0) management system, which uses inertial sensors to control the car's aero in 500 milliseconds.

Aventador SVJ LP 770-4 Roadster (2019–2021)

The roadster variant of the SVJ was unveiled at the 2019 Geneva Motor Show and will be produced in a limited series of 800 units. The car includes a removable hard top made of two different pieces made of carbon fibre and retains the powertrain from the coupé. The performance figures remain the same as the coupe.

Aventador LP 780-4 Ultimae (2021)

The last variant of the Aventador was announced at the premiere on Lamborghini's social channels in July 2021. It is limited to 600 units (350 for the Coupé, 250 for the Roadster). It has all the standard features of the Aventador S and SVJ. The top speed is claimed to be .

Lamborghini was forced to restart production to replace those lost 15 vehicles. The very last Ultimae, and thus the very last Aventador, to be produced was customized as an homage to a one-of-a-kind Lamborghini Miura P400 (not to be confused with the 2016 homages to the Miura), painted in a unique Azzuro Flake color.

Special editions

Aventador J

Six months after unveiling the Aventador, plans for a roadster version were leaked by the U.S. EPA after it included the model on a data sheet on its website. Lamborghini officially unveiled the Aventador J to the world at the 2012 Geneva Motor Show. The roofless and windowless barchetta concept car uses the same V12 engine as the standard Aventador, producing  with the same single-clutch transmission as in the standard coupé.

The J designation was thought to have come from Appendix J in the FIA rulebook that describes the technical specifications of race cars. However, during an interview with designer Filippo Perini, it was revealed that the 'J' actually stands for Jota, in reference to a 1970s one-off Lamborghini Miura Jota, which also conformed to the FIA's Appendix J regulations.

Aventador LP 720-4 50º Anniversario (2013)

The Aventador LP 720-4 50º Anniversario is a limited (200 units - 100 Coupé and 100 Roadster) version of the Aventador LP 700-4 commemorating the 50th anniversary of Automobili Lamborghini. It included increased engine power to  via a new specific engine calibration, enlarged and extended front air intakes and the aerodynamic splitter, small flaps set into the sides, new rear end featuring an enlarged diffuser and expansive meshwork that further improves engine-compartment ventilation, model-exclusive Giallo Maggio (Italian for "May yellow") body colour featuring sparkling yellow paintwork with a layer of transparent and highly reflective particles; front and rear and sills in two-tone (Giallo Maggio and matte black) design, semi-aniline leather interior upholstery in Nero Ade (black) with Terra Emilia (optional Giallo Quercus (yellow)) with Q-Citura stitch diamond pattern, 50th anniversary emblem in forged composite carbon-fibre.

The coupé was unveiled at the 2013 Shanghai Motor Show.

The roadster was unveiled at the 2013 Quail Motorsports Gathering.

Aventador Pirelli Edition (2014)

The Lamborghini Aventador LP 700-4 Pirelli Edition was announced in December 2014. Celebrating a 50-year association between Lamborghini and Pirelli, it features a design and colour scheme that echoes the Pirelli tyre, with a thin red stripe running across the roof. The special edition came in both Coupé and Roadster form.

Aventador SVJ 63 (2018) 

The Aventador SVJ "63 Edition", a special edition commemorating the company's year of foundation (1963), featuring a special white livery with the number 63 more prominent on the car would be first offered for sale and limited to just 63 units, while the whole production run of the Aventador SVJ would be limited to just 963 units in total including the 63 units, with deliveries starting in the beginning of 2019.

Aventador SVJ 63 Roadster (2019) 

The SVJ 63 Roadster is a special edition of the Aventador SVJ, unveiled at Monterey Car Week in August 2019. It pays tribute to the victories of 2018 and 2019 at the 24 Hours of Daytona and the 12 Hours of Sebring. 63 were built, the number representing Lamborghini's founding in 1963. Technical specifications are the same as the SVJ Roadster.

Aventador SVJ Roadster Xago Edition (2020) 
The SVJ Roadster Xago Edition was unveiled on July 17, 2020, for clients of the newly created virtual version of the Ad Personam studio, based on the standard SVJ Roadster. Taking inspiration from the hexagonal storms of Saturn, the exterior colour scheme of the car took 120 hours and another 80 hours for the interior to be reworked to match. Only 10 units were produced. Technical specifications are the same as the SVJ Roadster.

Other Lamborghinis based on the Aventador

Veneno 

The Lamborghini Veneno is a limited-run supercar based on the Aventador LP 700-4. The Veneno was developed to celebrate Lamborghini's 50th anniversary. It was introduced at the 2013 Geneva Motor Show. The increase in power was achieved by enlarging the air intakes and modifying the exhaust system. Lamborghini built just four examples of the Veneno Coupé: one retained for the factory, and three cars for customers, all of which had different accent colors representing the Italian flag. In addition to the coupé, a further nine units of a Roadster version were produced for customers.

Centenario 

The Lamborghini Centenario is a limited production supercar based on the Aventador SV. The Centenario coupé was unveiled at the 2016 Geneva Motor Show and the Centenario Roadster was unveiled at The Quail, during Monterey Car Week 2016 to celebrate the 100th birthday of Ferruccio Lamborghini. The engine is mated to the same 7-speed ISR automated manual gearbox as used on an Aventador SV along with the all-wheel-drive drivetrain developed by Haldex. The power steering has two turns lock-to-lock. The suspension system is a push-rod design. A total of 40 cars, (half of them coupés and the other half roadsters) were produced, all of which were already sold via invitation to selected customers.

SC18 Alston 

 
Introduced in November 2018, the SC18 Alston is a track-focused one-off created for a customer under close collaboration with Lamborghini's motorsport division Squadra Corse. Based on the Aventador SVJ, the SC18 Alston incorporates aerodynamic elements taken from the Huracán GT3 and the Huracán Super Trofeo EVO. Main features of the car include a big adjustable carbon-fibre rear wing, front air intakes on the hood taken from the Huracán GT3, new Veneno-like wheels created especially for the car, a one-off exhaust system along with rear lights from the Centenario, rear fenders, hood scoops and the central fin from the Huracán Super Trofeo Evo, and a new front bumper. The mechanical components and drive train remain the same as the donor car.

Sián FKP 37 

 
The Lamborghini Sián FKP 37 is the first hybrid sports car to be built by the manufacturer, honouring the late Ferdinand Karl Piëch (whose initials emboss the name of the car), and his birth year 1937 (the last two digits make up the name of the car as well). Power comes from a reconfigured 6.5-litre naturally-aspirated V12 from the Aventador SVJ and an electric motor powered by supercapacitors at the rear axle, for a total of  making the Sián the most powerful production Lamborghini automobile ever created at its online launch on 3 September 2019. The exterior design incorporates a wedge shape, a trademark of famed automobile designer Marcello Gandini and mixes that with the design of the Terzo Millennio concept introduced two years prior. The Y shaped daytime running headlights are inspired by the Lamborghini Terzo Millennio while at the rear an active fixed rear wing with the number "63" embossed on its winglets to honour the company's year of incorporation. Downforce is maximised by the model's prominent side air intakes and large carbon fibre front splitter. A transparent "Peroscopio" glass panel runs from the centre of the roof and rolls back into the slatted engine cover adds light and visibility for the occupants, and the six hexagonal taillights are an inspiration from the Countach. Production of the Sián FKP 37 will be limited to 63 units and all have already been sold. Lamborghini's Ad Personam division will be responsible for the manufacture of the Sián. The car was officially unveiled to the public at the 2019 Frankfurt Motor Show configured in a unique "electric gold" paint. The coupé will be limited to just 63 units and additionally, the roadster variant of the Sián, which has been limited to 19 units, have all been sold out.

Essenza SCV12 

 
The Lamborghini Essenza SCV12 is a track-only sports car built by Lamborghini and their motorsport division, Squadra Corse. When it was unveiled online to the public on July 29, 2020, the Essenza SCV12 became the most powerful purely, naturally-aspirated car, pushing out a maximum power output of  achieved by a horizontally-mounted 6.5-litre naturally-aspirated V12 from the Aventador SVJ and a ram air induction system, the latter serving as the aspiration. The Essenza SCV12 is  lighter than the Aventador SVJ and features a carbon fibre monocoque which is the first to be homologated without the use of metal. The Essenza SVC12 is also the first car to be developed according to the FIA prototype safety rules. Production is limited to 40 units and it will have its own one-make racing series.

Countach LPI 800-4 

The Lamborghini Countach LPI 800-4 is a limited edition hybrid car made in 2021 inspired by the Lamborghini Countach. The car's exterior design has been adapted from the Countach and the Lamborghini Sián FKP 37. Production will be limited to 112 units, a number inspired by the LP112 type code of the original Countach project.

Others 

 SC20 Alston (One-off roofless & windowless car, similar to the Aventador J)
 Invencible (Final Naturally-aspirated V12 Lamborghini coupe)
 Auténtica (Final Naturally-aspirated V12 Lamborghini roadster)

Reception

Automotive magazines such as Car and Driver and Motor Trend reviewed the Aventador. Car and Driver titled their article "The best Lamborghini ever." Motor Trend described it as "the friendliest V12 supercar in the world." Praise for Lamborghini's all-new V12 powerplant centered on the engine's responsiveness, torque, and smooth power output. Criticism centered mainly around the Aventador's unrefined single-disc clutch.

On 31 July 2011, the Aventador was reviewed by the motorsport show Top Gear. Host Richard Hammond was impressed with the performance and handling of the car. His biggest complaint was a nostalgic poke at the Aventador's accessible temperament, implying that it left him longing for the "danger" associated with driving previous Lamborghini supercars. The Aventador posted the fifth fastest time ever recorded on the Top Gear test track with a time of 1:16.5, beating the  Bugatti Veyron Super Sport, the Ferrari Enzo, the Porsche 911 GT3, and other supercars from around the world. In season 18 of the programme, presenter Jeremy Clarkson said that the Aventador is better than the Ferrari 458 Italia (which they had previously called the best supercar ever), describing it as being "£200,000 worth of dreams." The Aventador won the "Supercar of the Year 2011" from Top Gear. Hammond later reviewed the Aventador Roadster in a segment of 50 years of Lamborghini.

Marketing

BMC Switzerland produced a limited (50 units) edition of Lamborghini 50th Anniversary Edition impec bicycles inspired by the Lamborghini Aventador. The bikes cost  each via international BMC or Lamborghini dealer network, with delivery done by the dealer.

Sales

References

External links

Aventador
Veneno 
Centenario Roadster

Cars introduced in 2011
Cars discontinued in 2022
Coupés
Flagship vehicles
Aventador
Rear mid-engine, all-wheel-drive vehicles
Vehicles with four-wheel steering
Sports cars
2020s cars